Voluta polypleura is a species of medium-sized sea snail and a marine gastropod mollusk in the family Volutidae. It has the common name of De Marcoi's volute.

Shell description
The maximum reported shell length for this species is 108 mm.

Subspecies
Voluta polypleura contains the following subspecies:
Voluta polypleura polypleura (Crosse, 1876).
Voluta polypleura retemirabilis (Petuch, 1981).

References

External links
 

Volutidae
Gastropods described in 1876